Zeuxiotrix is a genus of parasitic flies in the family Tachinidae.

Species
Zeuxiotrix atra Mesnil, 1976
Zeuxiotrix cinerosa Mesnil, 1976

References

Dexiinae
Diptera of Africa
Tachinidae genera